Sir Carlyle Arnold Glean,  (11 February 1932 – 21 December 2021) was a Grenadian politician, who served as Governor-General of Grenada from 2008 to 2013.

Early life and education
Glean was born in Gouyave, Grenada, British Windward Islands, on 11 February 1932. He was educated at the University of Calgary (BEd) and the University of East Anglia (MA, 1982).

Career in politics
Glean served as Minister of Education in the government of Sir Nicholas Brathwaite from 1990 to 1995, after which he retired from politics.

In 2008, he was appointed Governor-General of Grenada by Elizabeth II, Queen of Grenada. He served in this position until 2013 when he was succeeded by Dame Cécile La Grenade.

Personal life and death
Glean died on 21 December 2021, at the age of 89.  He received tributes from current Governor-General La Grenade, Prime Minister Keith Mitchell, and the National Democratic Congress.

Honours

Commonwealth Honours
  -  : Knight Grand Cross of the Order of St. Michael and St. George (GCMG)

References

External links
 Grenada to swear in new governor general

1932 births
2021 deaths
University of Calgary alumni
Alumni of the University of East Anglia
Education ministers of Grenada
Governors-General of Grenada
People from Saint John Parish, Grenada